Spectator Nunatak is an isolated, mainly ice-covered nunatak consisting of hornblende, standing 4 nautical miles (7 km) west of the Pomerantz Tableland, Usarp Mountains. The feature was used as a survey station by the New Zealand Geological Survey Antarctic Expedition (NZGSAE) (1963–64), who gave the name because of its aspect.

Nunataks of Oates Land